The New Champion is a 1925 American silent sports action film directed by B. Reeves Eason and starring William Fairbanks, Edith Roberts and Lotus Thompson.

Cast 
 William Fairbanks as Bob
 Edith Roberts as Polly Brand
 Lotus Thompson as Lucy Nichols
 Lloyd Whitlock as Jack Melville
 Frank Hagney as 'Knockout' Riley
 Al Kaufman as Fight Promoter
 Marion Court as Mrs. Nichols
 Bert Appling as Blacksmith

References

Bibliography 
 James Robert Parish & Michael R. Pitts. Film directors: a guide to their American films. Scarecrow Press, 1974.

External links 

1925 films
Films directed by B. Reeves Eason
American silent feature films
American black-and-white films
1920s sports films
Columbia Pictures films
American boxing films
Sports action films
1920s American films
Silent sports films